King of the Mounties is a 1942 Republic 12-chapter film serial, directed by William Witney. Allan Lane played Sgt. Dave King of the Mounties, with Peggy Drake as heroine Carol Brent, and Abner Biberman played the villainous Japanese admiral Yamata.

Plot
Canada is being bombed mercilessly by a mysterious plane, which is shaped like a boomerang, and is dubbed the Falcon. The plane is under the command of Japanese admiral Yamata. The identity of the plane remains a mystery until Professor Marshall Brent and his daughter Carol arrive with a new type of airplane detector. The Axis forces are planning a Canadian invasion, and feeling that Professor Brent poses a threat to their plan, they kidnap him. RCMP Sergeant Dave King attempts a rescue, but the professor is killed when the plane in which he is held captive crashes into a riverboat.

Carol Brent, determined to carry on her father's work, manages with Sergeant King's help to prevent the Axis spies from capturing the device her father invented. When the spy ring makes a last desperate attempt to capture the device from the cabin in which she is hiding out, she destroys it rather than let it fall into enemy hands. She is kidnapped and taken to a volcanic crater, where the spy ring has its headquarters. Rescuing her is up to King.

Cast
 Allan Lane as Sgt Dave King
 Gilbert Emery as Commissioner Morrison
 Russell Hicks as Marshal Carleton
 Peggy Drake as Carol Brent
 George Irving as Prof Marshall Brent
 Abner Biberman as Admiral Yamata
 William Vaughn as Marshal Von Horst
 Nestor Paiva as Count Baroni
 Bradley Page as Charles Blake
 Anthony Warde as Stark
 Forrest Taylor as Telegrapher

Production
King of the Mounties was budgeted at $136,320 although the final negative cost was $139,422 (a $3,102, or 2.3%, overspend). It was the cheapest Republic serial of 1942.

It was filmed between June 23 and July 17, 1942 under several working titles: King of the Royal Mounted Rides Again, King of the Royal Mounted Strikes Again, King of the Royal Mounted Strikes Back and King of the Northwest Mounted Strikes Again.  The serial's production number was 1195.

Republic liked calling their heroes "King" in order to use the title "King of..." The studio had found success with this naming scheme following the adaptation of Zane Grey's King of the Royal Mounted.

Parts of this serial are considered lost. However, the serial was restored by SerialSquadron.com, with added sound in places, as well as subtitles in others, where the soundtrack no longer existed. The restored serial has now been made available on DVD by Serial Squadron.

Release

Theatrical
King of the Mounties' official release date is 17 October 1942, although this is actually the date the sixth chapter was made available to film exchanges.

Chapter titles
 Phantom Invaders (24min 10s)
 Road to Death (15min 33s)
 Human Target (15min 42s)
 Railroad Saboteurs (15min 36s)
 Suicide Dive (15min 34s)
 Blazing Barrier (15min 33s)
 Perilous Plunge (15min 34s)
 Electrocuted (15min 40s)
 Reign of Terror (15min 32s)
 The Flying Coffin (15min 35s)
 Deliberate Murder (15min 32s)
 On to Victory (15min 32s)
Source:

References

External links
 
 

1942 films
Northern (genre) films
American black-and-white films
1940s English-language films
Lost American films
Films based on comic strips
Republic Pictures film serials
Films directed by William Witney
Royal Canadian Mounted Police in fiction
Films with screenplays by Joseph F. Poland